Raúl García Pierna (born 23 February 2001) is a Spanish cyclist, who currently rides for UCI ProTeam .

Major results
2019
 3rd  Scratch, UEC European Junior Track Championships
 3rd Road race, National Junior Road Championships
2020
 1st  Time trial, National Under-23 Road Championships
 3rd  Points race, UCI Junior Track World Championships
 3rd  Elimination race, UEC European Under-23 Track Championships
 3rd Madison, National Track Championships
 3rd Overall Vuelta a Zamora
1st Stage 4
2021
 7th Overall Istrian Spring Trophy
2022
 1st  Time trial, National Road Championships
 8th Time trial, UCI Road World Under-23 Championships

Grand Tour general classification results timeline

References

External links

2001 births
Living people
Spanish male cyclists
Cyclists from the Community of Madrid